Idanilangal is a 1985 Indian Malayalam-language film, directed by I. V. Sasi and produced by K. Balachander. The film has musical score by M. S. Viswanathan.

Cast

Mohanlal as Balan Nair
Mammootty as Vijayan
Menaka as Bhanu
Seema as Chinnammu
Sukumari as Saramachettathi
Shubha as Madhavi
Bhagyalakshmi (actress)
Jagannatha Varma
Janardanan
Raveendran as Maniyan
Kundara Johnny as Kuttappan
Kuthiravattam Pappu as Thamapilla
Meena as Kalikuttiyamma
Paravoor Bharathan
Ranipadmini as Subhadra
Vincent
Vineeth as Kunjumon

Soundtrack
The music was composed by M. S. Viswanathan and the lyrics were written by S. Ramesan Nair.

References

External links
 

1985 films
1980s Malayalam-language films
Films with screenplays by M. T. Vasudevan Nair
Films scored by M. S. Viswanathan
Films directed by I. V. Sasi